This list is of the Places of Scenic Beauty of Japan located within the Prefecture of Aomori.

National Places of Scenic Beauty
As of 1 July 2020, ten Places have been designated at a national level (including one *Special Place of Scenic Beauty); Lake Towada-Oirase River spans the prefectural borders with Akita.

Prefectural Places of Scenic Beauty
As of 1 November 2021, one Place has been designated at a prefectural level.

Municipal Places of Scenic Beauty
As of 1 May 2019, ten Places have been designated at a municipal level.

Registered Places of Scenic Beauty
As of 1 July 2020, four Monuments have been registered (as opposed to designated) as Places of Scenic Beauty at a national level.

See also
 Cultural Properties of Japan
 List of Historic Sites of Japan (Aomori)
 List of parks and gardens of Aomori Prefecture
 List of Cultural Properties of Japan - paintings (Aomori)

References

External links
  Cultural Properties of Aomori Prefecture

Tourist attractions in Aomori Prefecture
Places of Scenic Beauty